The Gansu Braves or Gansu Army was a unit of 10,000 Chinese Muslim troops from the northwestern province of Kansu (Gansu) in the last decades of the Qing dynasty (1644–1912). Loyal to the Qing, the Braves were recruited in 1895 to suppress a Muslim revolt in Gansu. Under the command of General Dong Fuxiang (1839–1908), they were transferred to the Beijing metropolitan area in 1898, where they officially became the Rear Division of the Wuwei Corps, a modern army that protected the imperial capital. The Gansu Army included Hui Muslims, Salar Muslims, Dongxiang Muslims, and Bonan Muslims.

The Braves, who wore traditional uniforms but were armed with modern rifles and artillery, played an important role in 1900 during the Boxer Rebellion. After helping to repel the Seymour Expedition, a multinational foreign force sent from Tianjin to relieve the Beijing Legation Quarter in early June, the Muslim troops were the fiercest attackers during the siege of the legations from 20 June to 14 August. They suffered heavy casualties at the Battle of Peking, in which the Eight-Nation Alliance relieved the siege. The Kansu Braves then guarded the Imperial Court on their journey to Xi'an.

Origins in Gansu
In the spring of 1895, a Muslim revolt erupted in the southern parts of Gansu province. Dong Fuxiang (1839–1908), who had fought under Zuo Zongtang (1812–1885) in the suppression of a larger Muslim rebellion in the 1860s and 1870s, had by 1895 become Imperial Commissioner in Gansu and he now commanded the Muslim militias that Zuo had recruited locally. In early July 1895, Dong commanded these troops in relieving the siege of Didao by Muslims rebels.

When he attended Empress Dowager Cixi's sixtieth birthday celebrations in Beijing in August 1895, he was recommended to Cixi by the powerful Manchu minister Ronglu. The Muslim rebels, who were armed with muzzleloaders and various white arms, were overwhelmed by the firepower of the modern Remington and Mauser rifles that Dong brought back from Beijing. Dong also used his understanding of local politics to convince the rebels to return to their homes. By the spring of 1896, Gansu was again pacified.

Generals Dong Fuxiang, Ma Anliang and Ma Haiyan were originally called to Beijing during the First Sino-Japanese War in 1894, but the Dungan Revolt (1895) broke out and they were subsequently sent to crush the rebels. During the Hundred Days' Reform in 1898 Generals Dong Fuxiang, Ma Anliang, and Ma Haiyan were called to Beijing and helped put an end to the reform movement along with Ma Fulu and Ma Fuxiang.

Transfer to Beijing

Following the killing of two German missionaries in Shandong in November 1897, foreign powers engaged in a "scramble for concessions" that threatened to split China into several spheres of influence. To protect the imperial capital against possible attacks, Cixi had the Gansu Army transferred to Beijing in the summer of 1898. She admired the Gansu Army because Ronglu, who was in her favor, had a close relation with its commander Dong Fuxiang. On their way to Beijing, Dong's troops attacked Christian churches in Baoding. After the failure of the Hundred Days' Reform (11 June – 21 September 1898) sponsored by the Guangxu Emperor, Cixi named Ronglu Minister of War and highest official in the Grand Council, and put him in charge of reforming the metropolitan armies. Ronglu made Dong's militia the "Rear Division" of a new corps called the "Wuwei Corps". Dong Fuxiang was the only commander of the five divisions who did not hide his hostility toward foreigners.

Beijing residents and foreigners alike feared the turbulent Muslim troops. It was said "the troops are to act tomorrow when all foreigners in Peking are to be wiped out and the golden age return for China." during 23 October 1898. Some Westerners described the Gansu Braves as the "10,000 Islamic rabble","a disorderly rabble of about 10,000 men, most of whom were Mohammedans", or Kansu Irregulars, others as "ten thousand Mohammedan cutthroats feared by even the Chinese". In late September and early October 1898, several minor clashes between the Gansu troops and foreigners heightened tensions in the capital. Soldiers from the United States Marine Corps were among the new guards called from Tianjin to protect the Beijing Legation Quarter from possible assaults. By late October, rumors were circulating that the Gansu Army was preparing to kill all foreigners in Beijing. Responding to an ultimatum by the foreign ministers, Cixi had the Gansu troops transferred to the "Southern Park" (Nanyuan ), which was also known as the "Hunting Park" because emperors of the Ming and Qing dynasties had used it for large-scale hunts and military drills. By the 1880s, this large expanse of land south of Beijing – it was several times larger than the walled city – had been partly converted into farmland, but it was conveniently located near the railroad that connected Beijing to Tianjin. The Kansu braves were involved in a scuffle at a theatre. At the section of railroad at Fungtai, two British engineers were almost beaten to death by the Muslim Kansu troops, and foreign ministers asked that they be pulled back since they were threatening the safety of foreigners.

The Boxer Rebellion

Rise of the Boxers and return to the walled city

On 5 January 1900, Sir Claude MacDonald, the British Minister in Beijing, wrote to the Foreign Office about a movement called the "Boxers" that had been attacking Christian property and Chinese converts in Shandong and southern Zhili province. In the early months of 1900, this "Boxer movement" took dramatic expansion in northern Zhili – the area surrounding Beijing – and Boxers even started to appear in the capital. In late May, the anti-Christian Boxers took a broader anti-foreign turn, and as they became more organized, they started to attack the Beijing–Baoding railway and to cut telegraph lines between Beijing and Tianjin.

The Qing court hesitated between annihilating, "pacifying", or supporting the Boxers. From 27 to 29 May, Cixi received Dong Fuxiang in audiences at the Summer Palace. Dong assured her that he could get rid of the foreign "barbarians" if necessary, increasing the dowager's confidence in China's ability to drive out foreigners if war became unavoidable. Meanwhile, an increase in the number of the legation guards – they arrived in Beijing on 31 May – further inflamed anti-foreign sentiment in Beijing and its surrounding countryside: for the first time, Boxers started to attack foreigners directly. Several foreign powers sent warships under the Dagu Forts, which protected access to Tianjin and Beijing.

On 9 June, the bulk of the Kansu Braves escorted Empress Dowager Cixi back to the Forbidden City from the Summer Palace; they set camp in the southern part of city, in empty lands in front of the Temple of Heaven and the Temple of Agriculture. Fearing the worst, Sir Claude MacDonald immediately sent a telegram calling for Admiral Seymour to send help from Tianjin. On 10 June, the anti-foreign and pro-Boxer prince Duan replaced the anti-Boxer and more moderate prince Qing as the head of the Zongli Yamen, the bureau through which the Qing government communicated with foreigners. On that same day the telegraph lines were cut off for good.

Assassination of Sugiyama Akira

On the morning of 11 June, the British sent a large convoy of carts to greet the Seymour Expedition. The procession safely passed through the areas occupied by the Gansu troops inside the walled city and soon reached the Majiapu (Machiapu) train station south of Beijing, where the relief troops were expected to arrive soon. Except that it they never arrived, and the carts had to head back to the legations. A smaller Italian delegation guarded by a few riflemen narrowly escaped Dong Fuxiang's soldiers, who were lining up to block Beijing's main southern gate the Yongding Gate, but also managed to return safely.

That same afternoon, the Japanese legation sent secretary Sugiyama Akira to the station unguarded to greet the Japanese troops. With his formal western suit and a bowler hat, Sugiyama made a conspicuous target. The Kansu Muslim troops seized him from his cart near the Yongding Gate, hacked him into pieces, decapitated him, and left his mutilated body and severed head and genitals on the street. George Morrison, the Beijing correspondent for the London Times, claimed that they also carved his heart out and sent it to Dong Fuxiang. The Japanese legation lodged a formal protest at the Tsungli Yamen, which expressed its regrets and explained that Sugiyama had been killed by "bandits".

Combat
Dong was extremely anti-foreign, and gave full support to Cixi and the Boxers. General Dong committed his Muslim troops to join the Boxers to attack foreigners in Beijing. They attacked the legation quarter relentlessly. They were also known for their intolerance towards the Opium trade. A Japanese chancellor, Sugiyama Akira, and several Westerners were killed by the Kansu braves. The Muslim troops were reportedly enthusiastic about going on the offensive and killing foreigners.

The German diplomat in Beijing Clemens von Ketteler killed a Chinese civilian suspecting him of being a Boxer. In response, Boxers and thousands of Chinese Muslim Kansu Braves went on a violent riot against the westerners.

They were made out of 5,000 cavalry with the most modern repeating rifles. Some of them went on horseback.

The Kansu Braves and Boxers combined their forces to attack the foreigners and the legations.

In contrast to other units besieging the legations, like Ronglu's troops who let supplies and letters slip through to the besieged foreigners, the "sullen and suspicious" Kansu braves seriously pressed the siege and refused to let anything through, shooting at foreigners trying to smuggle things through their lines. Sir Claude Macdonald noted the "ferocity" of Dong Fuxiang's Kansu troops compared to the "restraint" of Ronglu's troops.

Battle summary

The Muslim troops led by Dong Fuxiang defeated the hastily assembled Seymour Expedition of the 8 nation alliance at the Battle of Langfang on 18 June. The Chinese won a major victory, and forced Seymour to retreat back to Tianjin with heavy casualties by 26 June. Langfang was the only battle the Muslim troops did outside of Beijing. After Langfang, Dong Fuxiang's troops only participated in battles inside of Beijing.

Summary of battles of General Dong Fuxiang: Ts'ai Ts'un, 24 July; Ho Hsi Wu, 25 July; An P'ing, 26 July; Ma T'ou, 27 July.

6,000 of the Muslim troops under Dong Fuxiang and 20,000 Boxers repulsed a relief column, driving them to Huang Ts'un. The Muslims camped outside the temples of Heaven and Agriculture.

The German Kaiser Wilhelm II was so alarmed by the Chinese Muslim troops that he requested the Caliph Abdul Hamid II of the Ottoman Empire to find a way to stop the Muslim troops from fighting. The Caliph agreed to the Kaiser's request and sent Enver Pasha (not the future Young Turk leader) to China in 1901, but the rebellion was over by that time. Because the Ottomans were not in a position to create a rift with the European nations, and to assist ties with Germany, an order imploring Chinese Muslims to avoid assisting the Boxers was issued by the Ottoman Khalifa and reprinted in Egyptian and Indian Muslim newspapers in spite of the fact that the predicament the British found themselves in the Boxer Rebellion was gratifying to Indian Muslims and Egyptians.

During the Battle of Peking at Zhengyang Gate the Muslim troops engaged in a fierce battle against the Alliance forces. The commanding Muslim general in the Chinese army, General Ma Fulu, and four cousins of his – his paternal cousins Ma Fugui 馬福貴, Ma Fuquan 馬福全, and his paternal nephews Ma Yaotu 馬耀圖, and Ma Zhaotu 馬兆圖— were killed while charging against the Alliance forces while a hundred Hui and Dongxiang Muslim troops from his home village in total died in the fighting at Zhengyang. The Battle at Zhengyang was fought against the British. After the battle was over, the Kansu Muslim troops, including General Ma Fuxiang, were among those guarding the Empress Dowager during her flight. The future Muslim General Ma Biao, who led Muslim cavalry to fight against the Japanese in the Second Sino-Japanese War, fought in the Boxer Rebellion as a private under General Ma Haiyan in the Battle of Peking against the foreigners. General Ma Haiyan died of exhaustion after the Imperial Court reached their destination, and his son Ma Qi took over his posts.

The role the Muslim troops played in the war incurred anger from the westerners towards them.

As the Imperial court evacuated to Xi'an in Shaanxi province after Beijing fell to the Alliance, the court gave signals that it would continue the war with Dong Fuxiang "opposing Court von Waldersee tooth and nail", and the court promoted Dong to Commander-in-chief.

The Muslim troops were described as "picked men, the bravest of the brave, the most fanatical of fanatics: and that is why the defence of the Emperor's city had been entrusted to them."

Organization and armament
They were organized into eight battalions of infantry, two squadrons of cavalry, two brigades of artillery, and one company of engineers. They were armed with modern weaponry such as Mauser repeater rifles and field artillery. They used scarlet and black banners.

Notable people
List of people who served in the Kansu Braves

Dong Fuxiang
Ma Fuxiang
Ma Fulu
Ma Fuxing
Ma Haiyan
Ma Biao
Ma Qi

Another Muslim general, Ma Anliang, Tongling of Hezhou joined the Kansu braves in fighting the foreigners.
Ma Anliang would go on to be an important Chinese warlord in the Ma clique during the Warlord Era.

The future Muslim General Ma Biao, who led Muslim cavalry to fight against the Japanese in the Second Sino-Japanese War, fought in the Boxer Rebellion as a private in the Battle of Peking against the foreigners. Another General, Ma Yukun, who commanded a separate unit, was believed to be the son of the Muslim General Ma Rulong by the Europeans. Ma Yugun fought with some success against Japan in the First Sino-Japanese War and in the Boxer Rebellion at the Battle of Yangcun and Battle of Tientsin. Ma Yugun was under General Song Qing's command as deputy commander.

When the imperial family decided to flee to Xi'an in August 1900 after the Eight-Nation Alliance captured Beijing at the end of the Boxer War the Muslim Kansu Braves escorted them. One of the officers, Ma Fuxiang, was rewarded by the Emperor, being appointed governor of Altay for his service. As mentioned above, his brother, Ma Fulu and four of his cousins died in combat during the attack on the legations. Ma Fuxing also served under Ma Fulu to guard the Qing Imperial court during the fighting. Originally buried at a Hui cemetery in Beijing, in 1995 Ma Fulu's remains were moved by his descendants to Yangwashan in Linxia County.

In the Second Sino-Japanese War, when the Japanese asked the Muslim General Ma Hongkui to defect and become head of a Muslim puppet state under the Japanese, Ma responded through Zhou Baihuang, the Ningxia Secretary of the Nationalist Party to remind the Japanese military chief of staff Itagaki Seishiro that many of his relatives fought and died in battle against Eight Nation Alliance forces during the Battle of Peking, including his uncle Ma Fulu, and that Japanese troops made up the majority of the Alliance forces so there would be no cooperation with the Japanese.

"恨不得馬踏倭鬼，給我已死先烈雪仇，與後輩爭光"。 "I am eager to stomp on the dwarf devils (A derogatory term for Japanese), I will give vengeance for the already dead martyrs, achieving glory with the younger generation." said by Ma Biao during the Second Sino-Japanese War with reference to his service in the Boxer Rebellion where he already fought the Japanese before World War II.

See also
Hui people

References

Military units and formations of the Qing dynasty
Military units and formations of the Boxer Rebellion
Military history of the Qing dynasty